Biovail Corporation was a Canadian pharmaceutical company, operating internationally in all aspects of pharmaceutical products.  Its major production facility was located in Steinbach, Manitoba. It merged with Valeant Pharmaceuticals International in 2010.

SAC/Gradient Analytics lawsuit and SEC complaint
In March 2006, CBS program 60 Minutes featured Biovail in a story about its lawsuit against hedge fund SAC Capital Partners and Camelback (now known as Gradient Analytics), among others. According to Eugene Melnyk, "there's a group of people that got together and essentially attacked the company by putting out false reports, and we're just fighting back for our shareholders."

The alleged conspiracy began with Camelback, an Arizona stock-analysis firm that advertises that it publishes impartial financial reports on companies to help investors evaluate stocks. In the spring of 2003, the hedge fund SAC asked them for a report on Biovail. Darryl Smith, Mark Rosenblum, Demetrios Anifantis, and Robert Ballash, former Camelback employees, alleged that Camelback had allowed their client SAC to determine the content and timing of their reports on Biovail.

Camelback said those former employees were lying and disgruntled, that Anifantis and Ballash were fired because of unethical conduct; Smith for poor performance; Rosenblum was laid off. These four say they were let go after they complained to their superiors about Camelback's practices. SAC denied all the charges in Biovail's lawsuit and said that the decline in the Biovail's stock was due to earnings shortfalls and regulatory investigations.

In March, 2008, the United States Securities and Exchange Commission (SEC) sued Biovail and some of its former officers, alleging that "present and former senior Biovail executives, obsessed with meeting quarterly and annual earnings guidance, repeatedly overstated earnings and hid losses in order to deceive investors and create the appearance of achieving earnings goals. When it ultimately became impossible to continue concealing the company's inability to meet its own earnings guidance, Biovail actively misled investors and analysts about the reasons for the company's poor performance."  Biovail settled for $10 million US.  Gradient Analytics, successor to Camelback, issued a press release stating that the SEC's suit "confirms the validity of Gradient's critical analysis of Biovail but raises serious questions about how companies retaliate against analysts with threats, intimidation, and lawsuits."

60 Minutes has been accused of botching the Biovail story by the Columbia Journalism Reviews Audit columnist and The New York Times Joe Nocera, who felt Lesley Stahl accepted Biovail's conspiracy theories about short sellers without proper consideration.

SAC and Gradient filed a suit against Biovail for malicious prosecution in February 2010.

Admission of making false statements to the public and illegal conduct - 2009 Ontario Securities Commission Settlement

As noted in the February 2009 Settlement Agreement with the Ontario Securities Commission: "Biovail admitted that [...] it violated Ontario securities law and engaged in conduct contrary to the public interest."

Penalties against Eugene Melnyk
In May 2011, the Ontario Securities Commission in Canada banned Eugene Melnyk from senior roles at public companies in Canada for five years and fined him $565,000. Earlier in the same year Melnyk had settled with the U.S. SEC, agreeing to pay a civil penalty of US$150,000; he had previously paid US$1 million to settle other claims with the SEC.

Legal issues
A class action suit has been filed against Biovail by investors who between December 14, 2006, and July 19, 2007, bought Biovail stock, alleging that the company had failed to disclose that the multi-dose study on depression drug Aplenzin would not be sufficient for the FDA to approve it.

References

External links
 Official site
 Herb Greenberg- Why suing critics usually backfires

Pharmaceutical companies of Canada
Canadian companies established in 2010
Health care companies established in 2010
2010 establishments in Canada
Accounting scandals
Fraud in Canada
2010 mergers and acquisitions